Birch mice (genus Sicista) are small jumping rodents that resemble mice with long, tufted tails and very long hind legs, allowing for remarkable leaps. They are the only extant members of the family Sminthidae. They are native to Eurasian forests and steppes. The animal's skin color is light brown or dark-brown to brownish yellow on the upper side and paler on the underside, but generally brownish. Birch mice have a vast geographic distribution in that they inhabit a wide variety of habitats, from semiarid areas to subalpine meadows. Although they have a diverse region of areas, their molecular and anatomical markers have claimed that Birch mice originated from Central Asia.

Species

Nineteen species are listed by the American Society of Mammalogists as of 2021:
 Armenian birch mouse, Sicista armenica
 Northern birch mouse, Sicista betulina
 Caucasian birch mouse, Sicista caucasica
 Long-tailed birch mouse, Sicista caudata
 Tsimlyansk birch mouse, Sicista cimlanica
 Chinese birch mouse, Sicista concolor
 Kazbeg birch mouse, Sicista kazbegica
 Kluchor birch mouse, Sicista kluchorica
 Nordmann's birch mouse, Sicista loriger
 Altai birch mouse, Sicista napaea
 Gray birch mouse, Sicista pseudonapaea
 Severtzov's birch mouse, Sicista severtzovi
 Strand's birch mouse, Sicista strandi
 Southern birch mouse, Sicista subtilis
 Talgar birch mouse, Sicista talgarica
 Terskey birch mouse, Sicista terskeica
 Tien Shan birch mouse, Sicista tianshanica
 Hungarian birch mouse, Sicista trizona
 Zhetysu birch mouse, Sicista zhetysuica

Phylogeny

All species of Sicista cluster into five major lineages: S. betulina, S. caucasica, S. caudata, S. tianschanica, and S. concolor.

References

Sminthidae
Taxa named by John Edward Gray